Kickoff, kick-off or kick off may refer to:

Sport
 Kick-off (association football), the method of starting a match or restarting after half-time or a scored goal
 Kick Off (magazine), a South African football magazine
 Kick Off (series), a series of computer association football games
 Kickoff (gridiron football), the method of starting a game or other drive in American football and Canadian football

Music
 Kick Off (album), a 1985 album by Onyanko Club
 "Kick-Off", a song by Relient K from the 2001 album The Anatomy of the Tongue in Cheek

Other
 Kickoff meeting